Karkú is a Chilean teen telenovela television series, co-produced by My Friend Entertainment and Televisión Nacional de Chile (TVN).

Plot
Emilia, a 13-year-old girl, is sent by her parents from the small city of Vallenar, Chile, to live with her uncles in metropolitan Santiago, Chile. There, she enters the British College, where she befriends Fernanda, Valentina, Zico, Alex, and Martín, with whom she tries to fund a year-end trip overseas. The series follows exploring everyday-life problems of teenagers, including friendship and romance.

Cast
Main cast
Constanza Piccoli as Emilia "Emi" Valdés
Ignacio Sepúlveda as Francisco "Zico" Sotomayor
Raquel Calderón as Fernanda "Feña" Urquieta
Cesar Morales as Martín Maldonado
Luciana Echeverría como Valentina "Vale" Urquieta
Vicente Muñoz como Alex Schilling
Constanza Herrero como Daniela "Dana" Hamilton (season 3 only)
Nicolás Guerra como Cristian "Chris" Hamilton (season 3 only)

Supporting cast
Gustavo Becerra as Inspector Palacios
Marcos Bucci as Marcos "Chanchivia" Valdivia
Patricia Irribarra as Miss Elena
Renato Münster as Uncle Arturo
Vania Alejandra López as Margarita
Peggy Cordero as Edna, Dana and Chris's grandmother
Carlos Embry as Manuel Valdés, Emilia's father
Araceli Vitta as Miss Fabiana Castillo
Paulina Hunt as Nurse María Eugenia
Javiera Hernández as Miss Daniela
Paula Sharim as Uncle Mariana 
Daniel Herrera as Lucas 
Francisca Reiss as Patricia, Emilia's mother
Rodrigo Leon as Diego, Fernanda's friend

Production and themes
The first Latin American telenovela for young audience, Karkú was co-produced My Friend Entertainment and Televisión Nacional de Chile (TVN). Its title is derived from mapudungún and means "to dare," which "faithfully reflects the spirit of the plot," according to TVN. The series was created Onell López Campos and José Francisco García, with Campos as director along with Juan Pablo Tapia, and García as executive producer, and Felipe Vergara and Soledad Pérez as producers. It explores the aging of teenagers, focusing on Latin America, and producers tried to prompt diligence, teamwork, and friendship on its viewers. López commented he tried to insert music as feature that "not only plays as an ornament, but is part of the undertaking of the protagonists, is a tool that they have."

Broadcasting
The first two seasons were broadcast by TVN in Chile; from February 5, to March 8, 2007, and from January 2, to February 6, 2008. The third season was first broadcast on Nickelodeon Latin America between June 17, and July 22, 2009. It aired in the other Latin American countries through Nickelodeon, with Ecuavisa also airing it in Ecuador, Señal Colombia in Colombia, and TV Brasil in Brazil. Spanish-language network ¡Sorpresa! broadcast the series on its back to school programming in the United States.

Reception
It was a success in Chile; its debuted had a 14.4 rating against 11.7 and 6.7 of Mekano and Futurama respectively. The complete first season had an average rating of 14.1. It was also popular in several countries of Latin America.

References

External links

2007 telenovelas
2007 Chilean television series debuts
2009 Chilean television series endings
Televisión Nacional de Chile telenovelas
Nickelodeon telenovelas
Children's telenovelas
Teen telenovelas
Television series about teenagers
Televisión Nacional de Chile original programming
Spanish-language Nickelodeon original programming